Chenming Calvin Hu (born 1947) is a Chinese-American electronic engineer who specializes in microelectronics. He is TSMC Distinguished Professor Emeritus in the electronic engineering and computer science department of the University of California, Berkeley, in the United States. In 2009, the Institute of Electrical and Electronics Engineers described him as a “microelectronics visionary … whose seminal work on metal-oxide semiconductor MOS reliability and device modeling has had enormous impact on the continued scaling of electronic devices”.

Education and career
Hu completed his bachelor's degree at the National Taiwan University in Taipei in 1968, and completed master's and doctoral degrees at the University of California, Berkeley in 1970 and 1973, respectively.

Currently Professor Emeritus, he has been a professor of electrical engineering and computer science at the University of California, Berkeley since 1976.

He has made significant contributions in microelectronics research. He was one of the developers of the FinFET, a multi-gated MOSFET device, and was among the creators of the Berkeley Short‐Channel IGFET Model family of MOSFETs. Since the 1980s, Hu has written extensively on the reliability of the silicon oxide layer in semi-conductors.

Hu was elected a member of the National Academy of Engineering in 1997 for contributions to the modeling integration-circuit devices and to the reliability and performance of VLSI systems.

Between 2001 and 2004 Hu was the chief technology officer of Taiwan Semiconductor Manufacturing Company. He has sat on the board of several companies, including Inphi Corporation, FormFactor, MoSys and SanDisk; he was chairman of the board of Celestry Design Solutions, which he founded.

Awards and honors
1997: elected to the United States National Academy of Engineering
1997: IEEE Jack Morton Award, "for outstanding contributions to semiconductor devices and technology"
2002: IEEE Solid-State Circuits Award (for developing the first international standard transistor model BSIM)
2002: IEEE Paul Rappaport Award
2009: IEEE Jun-ichi Nishizawa Medal, "for technical contributions to MOS device reliability, scaling of CMOS and compact device modeling"
2011: Asian American Engineer of the year award,
2011: National Taiwan University Distinguished Alumni Award,
2011: Semiconductor Industry Association Award,
2013: Phil Kaufman Award for Distinguished Contributions to EDA,
2014: National Medal of Technology and Innovation, given at the White House by Barack Obama in 2016.
2015: SEMI Award for North America, for the BSIM transistor family.
2016: Pan Wen Yuan Award, by the Industrial Technology Research Institute.
2020: IEEE Medal of Honor Award.

References

1947 births
Living people
Electrical engineering academics
Taiwanese emigrants to the United States
UC Berkeley College of Engineering alumni
Members of the United States National Academy of Engineering
UC Berkeley College of Engineering faculty
Foreign members of the Chinese Academy of Sciences
Taiwanese people from Beijing
Chinese emigrants to the United States
Engineers from Beijing
IEEE Medal of Honor recipients